Blood Drive is an American science fiction action television series that aired on Syfy from June 14 to September 6, 2017. On the same day that the finale aired, series creator James Roland announced that Syfy had decided to cancel the series after one season.

Plot
Blood Drive is set in the dystopian "distant future" of alternate 1999, after the "Great Fracking Quakes" have literally split the United States apart, with a giant ravine called "the Scar" being formed roughly along the route of the Mississippi River. A megacorporation, Heart Enterprises, exploits strange discoveries from the bottom of the Scar to become ubiquitous across American politics, society, and the economy. Meanwhile, as a result of environmental decline, water has become scarce and gasoline prohibitively expensive.

The series features Los Angeles Police Department officer Arthur Bailey (Alan Ritchson), a.k.a. "Barbie", who is forced to partner up with Grace D'Argento (Christina Ochoa), a dangerous femme fatale who has an agenda of her own, as they take part in a death race in which the cars run on human blood – the titular Blood Drive, whose master of ceremonies, Julian Slink (Colin Cunningham), is secretly a Heart employee. As they make their way through the Blood Drive, Arthur and Grace realize that Heart has been involved in their own pasts as well.

Cast

Main
 Alan Ritchson as Arthur Bailey
 Christina Ochoa as Grace D'Argento
 Thomas Dominique as Christopher Carpenter
 Marama Corlett as Aki
 Colin Cunningham as Julian Slink

Recurring
  Andrew Hall as the Gentleman
 Darren Kent as the Scholar
 Sean Cameron Michael as Old Man Heart
 Carel Nel as Rasher
 Aidan Whytock as Garrett Kemble
 Brandon Auret as Rib Bone
 Craig Jackson as Cliff
 Jenny Stead as Domi
 Alex McGregor as Karma

Episodes

Production

The show received a 13-episode direct-to-series order from Syfy on July 28, 2015. Each episode is based on a different genre of 1970s/1980s exploitation films, such as cannibals, nymphomaniacs, or insane asylums. Filming took place in Cape Town, South Africa.

Reception

Blood Drive received generally favorable reviews from critics. On Rotten Tomatoes it has an approval rating of 76% based on reviews from 21 critics. On Metacritic it has a score of 65 out of 100 based on reviews from 13 critics.

Daniel Fienberg of The Hollywood Reporter gave the show a positive review, noting that the show "kept me entertained and curious for longer than I expected."
Neil Genzlinger of The New York Times called it "a gleeful detour into grindhouse gore and raunch" and a sweatier, grimier and better-acted version of Death Race 2000.
Alex McLevy of The A.V. Club was critical of the show and gave it a grade C, saying "If grindhouse TV wants to thrive in the medium, it needs to put its shocks and flesh in service of something more than a game of perpetual provocation and one-upmanship."

See also 
 Death Race
 Upír z Feratu, a film involving a car that uses blood for fuel
 Blood Car, a film about a car that uses blood for fuel
 Road Kill, film about a road train that uses a pulp made by grinding human bodies for fuel
 Twisted Metal, a video game franchise

References

External links
 
 

2010s American science fiction television series
2017 American television series debuts
2017 American television series endings
American action television series
Dystopian television series
Fiction about death games
English-language television shows
Midnight movie television series
Post-apocalyptic television series
Television shows set in Los Angeles
Syfy original programming
Television series set in 1999
Alternate history television series
Television series by Universal Content Productions
Television shows filmed in South Africa
Water scarcity in fiction